Halterneck is a style of women's clothing strap that runs from the front of the garment around the back of the neck, generally leaving the upper back uncovered. The name comes from livestock halters.  The word "halter" derives from the Germanic words meaning "that by which anything is held". Halter is part of the German word for bra, . 

The halter style is used with swimsuits, to maximize sun tan exposure on the back and minimize tan lines. It is also used with dresses or shirts, to create a backless dress or top. The neck strap can itself be covered by the wearer's hair, leaving the impression from behind that nothing is holding the dress or shirt up.

If a bra is worn with a halter top, it is generally either strapless or of halterneck construction itself, to avoid exposing the back straps of a typical bra.

A halter top is a type of sleeveless shirt similar to a tank top (by the American English definition) but with the straps being tied behind the neck. In another style of the halter top, there is only a narrow strap behind the neck and a narrow strap behind the middle of the back, so that it is mostly backless.  This design resembles many bikini tops, although it covers the chest more and may cover some or all of the abdomen at the front.

It has been suggested that the neckline's appeal stems from the fact that "it eliminated the need for spoiling the back detail with straps, leaving an uninterrupted area of skin to expose to the sun by day and display by night."

See also

 Apron
 Décolletage
 Spaghetti strap

References

1970s fashion
1980s fashion
1990s fashion
2000s fashion
2010s fashion
Tops (clothing)
Dresses
Necklines
Undergarments

Women's clothing